The 1998 CIBC Canadian Senior Curling Championships were held February 7 to 15 at the Soo Curlers Association in Sault Ste. Marie, Ontario.

Men's

Teams

Standings

Results

Draw 1

Draw 2

Draw 3

Draw 4

Draw 5

Draw 6

Draw 7

Draw 8

Draw 9

Draw 10

Draw 11

Draw 12

Draw 13

Draw 14

Draw 15

Draw 16

Playoffs

Semifinal

Final

Women's

Teams

Standings

Results

Draw 1

Draw 2

Draw 3

Draw 4

Draw 5

Draw 6

Draw 7

Draw 8

Draw 9

Draw 10

Draw 11

Draw 12

Draw 13

Draw 14

Draw 15

Draw 16

Playoffs

Tiebreaker

Semifinal

Final

External links
 Men's statistics
 Women's statistics

References

1998 in Canadian curling
Canadian Senior Curling Championships
Curling in Northern Ontario
1998 in Ontario
Sport in Sault Ste. Marie, Ontario
February 1998 sports events in Canada